Summer Pockets and Summer Pockets Reflection Blue are visual novels developed by Key and published by Visual Arts in 2018 and 2020. The story is set on a fictional island on the Seto Inland Sea and follows the life of Hairi Takahara, a young man who uses the recent death of his grandmother as an excuse to escape to the island after an unpleasant incident. Once there, he gets to know the townsfolk of Torishirojima and multiple girls who are the focus of the story. The discography of Summer Pockets and Reflection Blue consists of two studio albums, three singles, two soundtracks, and six remix albums.

The core of the discography consists of two original soundtrack albums for the visual novels, one for Summer Pockets and the other for Reflection Blue. The soundtracks were produced by Key Sounds Label and released in 2018 and 2020. The music on the soundtracks was mainly composed and arranged by Jun Maeda, Shinji Orito, Donmaru, Tomohiro Takeshita and Ryō Mizutsuki. Two image song albums were released in 2018 and 2020. Six remix albums were released for the two games between 2018 and 2020. Three singles were released between 2018 and 2020 consisting of theme song singles for the visual novels.

Albums

Swallow Tale
Swallow Tale is a remix album which contains a selection of songs from the visual novel Summer Pockets, remixed by Shōji Morifuji and Yūichiro Tsukagoshi. The album is otherwise composed and produced by Jun Maeda, Shinji Orito, Tomohiro Takeshita, and Ryō Mizutsuki. This album was released as a bonus item, included with the limited edition version of Summer Pockets for Windows released on June 29, 2018, and it bears the catalog number KSLA-0148 by Key Sounds Label. As a result, it was not released for individual sale. The album contains one disc with eight remixed music tracks from the visual novel. Emiri Iwai sings "Tsumugi no Natsuyasumi - Sunset Lighthouse Version -", and Konomi Suzuki sings "Alkatale - Acid Blue Remix -".

Summer Pockets Original Soundtrack
The Summer Pockets Original Soundtrack, from the visual novel Summer Pockets, was released on September 26, 2018 in Japan by Key Sounds Label bearing the catalog numbers KSLA-0149—0151 and KSLM-0149—0151. The soundtrack contains three discs totaling 48 music tracks composed, arranged, and produced by Jun Maeda, Shinji Orito, Donmaru, Tomohiro Takeshita, Ryō Mizutsuki,  Kazuki Yanagawa, Bermei Inazawa, Shoyū, Masato Nakayama, and Yūichiro Tsukagoshi. Five artists provide vocals for six songs: Konomi Suzuki sings "Alkatale" and "Lasting Moment", Emiri Iwai sings "Tsumugi no Natsuyasumi", Yurika sings "Yasōka", Runa Mizutani sings "Hane no Yurikago", and Rionos sings "Pocket o Fukuramasete".

Sing!
Sing! is an image song album for the Summer Pockets visual novel, and it was released on December 29, 2018 at Comiket 95 in Japan by Key Sounds Label bearing the catalog number KSLA-0152. The album is for the heroines Shiroha Naruse, Ao Sorakado, Kamome Kushima and Tsumugi Wenders, and contains one disc with 14 tracks in regular and instrumental versions sung by Konomi Kohara (Shiroha), Natsumi Takamori (Ao), Tomomi Mineuchi (Kamome),  Emiri Iwai (Tsumugi), Ayaka Kitazawa and Yurika. "Natsu ni Kimi o Machinagara", "Hiyoku no Chōtachi", "Departure!" and "With" were later used as insert songs in Summer Pockets Reflection Blue. The album is composed, arranged and produced by Shinji Orito, Ryō Mizutsuki, Donmaru, Tomohiro Takeshita, Yūichiro Tsukagoshi and Shōji Morifuji.

Summer Session: Hito Natsu no Bōken
 is a remix album which contains a selection of songs from the visual novel Summer Pockets, remixed by Hideki Higuchi. The album is otherwise composed and produced by Jun Maeda, Shinji Orito, Donmaru, Tomohiro Takeshita and Ryō Mizutsuki. It was released on December 29, 2018 at Comiket 95 in Japan by Key Sounds Label bearing the catalog number KSLA-0153. The album contains one disc with eight remixed music tracks from the visual novel.

Seven's Sea
Seven's Sea is a remix album which contains a selection of songs from the visual novel Summer Pockets remixed into electronic dance music. It was released on April 29, 2019 at the Character1 event in Japan by Key Sounds Label bearing the catalog number KSLA-0161. The album contains one disc with 12 tracks originally composed by Jun Maeda Shinji Orito, Donmaru and Tomohiro Takeshita, and features 12 separate remix artists. Seven artists provide vocals for nine songs: Aimi Tanaka sings "Chaahan Rhapsody", Emiri Iwai sings "Tsumugi no Natsuyasumi", Runa Mizutani sings "Splash Shooter" and "Hane no Yurikago", Ayaka Kitazawa sings "Silhouette", Yurika sings "Yasōka", Konomi Suzuki sings "Lasting Moment" and "Alkatale", and Rionos sings "Pocket o Fukuramasete".

Echoes of Summer
Echoes of Summer is a remix album which contains a selection of songs from the visual novel Summer Pockets, remixed by Hironori Anazawa. The album is otherwise composed and produced by Jun Maeda, Shinji Orito, Donmaru, Tomohiro Takeshita and Ryō Mizutsuki. It was released on July 27, 2019 in Japan by Key Sounds Label bearing the catalog number KSLA-0162. The album contains one disc with 12 remixed music tracks from the visual novel, and it was performed by the Petrozavodsk State Philharmonic Orchestra, the Taurida State Symphony Orchestra, and the Tokyo Chamber Orchestra.

Edain
Edain is a remix album which contains a selection of songs from the visual novel Summer Pockets Reflection Blue, remixed by Toshihiko Uchiyama. The album is otherwise composed and produced by Shinji Orito and Ryō Mizutsuki. This album was released as a bonus item, included with the limited and special editions version of Summer Pockets Reflection Blue for Windows released on June 26, 2020, and it bears the catalog number KSLA-0169 by Key Sounds Label. As a result, it was not released for individual sale. The album contains one disc with eight remixed music tracks from the visual novel. Runa Mizutani sings "Hane no Yurikago", Konomi Suzuki sings "Asterlore", and Rita provides vocals for the song "Natsu no Sunadokei".

Summer Chronicle
Summer Chronicle is a remix album with music tracks taken from the Air, Kud Wafter and Summer Pockets visual novels and arranged into violin and piano versions by Hironori Anazawa. The album is otherwise composed by Jun Maeda, Shinji Orito, Magome Togoshi, Jun'ichi Shimizu and Donmaru. It was released on August 22, 2020 in Japan by Key Sounds Label bearing the catalog number KSLA-0170. The album contains one disc with ten tracks; tracks 1–4 are from Air, tracks 5 and 6 are from Kud Wafter, and tracks 7–10 are from Summer Pockets.

Sing! 2
Sing! 2 is an image song album for the Summer Pockets Reflection Blue visual novel, and it was released on December 20, 2020 at Visual Arts Winter Fes in Japan by Key Sounds Label bearing the catalog number KSLA-0183. The album is for the heroines Shiki Kamiyama, Shizuku Mizuori and Miki Nomura, and contains one disc with six tracks in regular and instrumental versions sung by Ai Fairouz (Shiki), Sahomi Koyama (Shizuku) and Saku Ichimiya (Miki). The album is composed, arranged and produced by Shinji Orito, Ryō Mizutsuki, Toshihiko Uchiyama, Shoyū and Tomoyuki Nakazawa.

Summer Pockets Reflection Blue Original Soundtrack
The Summer Pockets Reflection Blue Original Soundtrack, from the visual novel Summer Pockets Reflection Blue, was released on December 25, 2020 bearing the catalog number KSLA-0182. The soundtrack contains one disc with 15 music tracks composed, arranged, and produced by Jun Maeda, Shinji Orito, Donmaru, Ryō Mizutsuki, Bermei Inazawa, Shoyū, Shōji Morifuji, and Yūichiro Tsukagoshi. Konomi Suzuki sings "Asterlore", Yurika sings "Aoki Konata", Runa Mizutani sings "Natsu no Sunadokei", and Rionos sings "Pocket o Fukuramasete (Sea, you again)".

Singles

Alkatale
 is a single from the visual novel Summer Pockets containing the game's opening theme song sung by Konomi Suzuki, and it was released on March 28, 2018 by Key Sounds Label bearing the catalog numbers KSLA-0146 and KSLM-0146. The single contains one disc with five tracks, two of which are background music tracks. The single is composed, arranged, and produced by Shinji Orito, Ryō Mizutsuki and Masato Nakayama.

Asterlore
 is a single from the visual novel Summer Pockets Reflection Blue containing two of the game's theme songs, and it was released on April 30, 2020 by Key Sounds Label bearing the catalog number KSLA-0168. The single contains one disc with five tracks, one of which is a background music track. The single is composed, arranged, and produced by Shinji Orito, Shin Kusakawa, Yūichiro Tsukagoshi and Donmaru. "Asterlore" sung by Konomi Suzuki is the opening theme, and "Shiroha no Komoriuta" sung by Konomi Kohara is an insert song.

Asterlore / Aoki Konata / Natsu no Sunadokei
 is a single from the visual novel Summer Pockets Reflection Blue containing three of the game's theme songs, and it was released on September 25, 2020 by Key Sounds Label bearing the catalog number KSLA-0173. The single contains one disc with six tracks in regular and instrumental versions. The single is composed, arranged, and produced by Shinji Orito, Donmaru, Ryō Mizutsuki and Yūichiro Tsukagoshi. "Asterlore" sung by Konomi Suzuki is the opening theme, "Aoki Konata" sung by Yurika is one of the ending themes, and "Natsu no Sunadokei" sung by Runa Mizutani is an insert song.

Chart positions

References

Discographies of Japanese artists
Key Sounds Label
Video game music discographies